Confederate Cemetery at Lewisburg (also known as Confederate Burial Grounds) is a historic cemetery located at Lewisburg, Greenbrier County, West Virginia. The cemetery is the final resting place of 95 unknown Confederate soldiers from the Battles of Lewisburg (May 23, 1862) and Droop Mountain (November 6, 1863). They are buried in a three-foot-high mound shaped as a Christian cross.  The cross measures 80 feet, 5 inches in length, with the "arm" extending 53 feet.  There are four commemorative monuments, including one installed by the Federal government in 1956.  It is enclosed by a six-foot-high wrought iron fence.

The Confederate "monument was erected by the United Daughters of the Confederacy at a cost of $2,800. The monument was originally located on the campus of the Greenbrier College, but moved to its present location, when U.S. Route 60 was relocated."

It was listed on the National Register of Historic Places in 1988.

References

External links
 Battle of Lewisburg
 Droop Mountain Battlefield State Park
 
 

American Civil War cemeteries
Buildings and structures in Greenbrier County, West Virginia
Cemeteries on the National Register of Historic Places in West Virginia
Confederate States of America monuments and memorials in West Virginia
Greenbrier County, West Virginia in the American Civil War
Monuments and memorials on the National Register of Historic Places in West Virginia
National Register of Historic Places in Greenbrier County, West Virginia
1862 establishments in Virginia
Confederate States of America cemeteries